Elvir Krehmić (born 27 April 1973) is a retired Bosnian athlete specializing in the high jump. He competed at the 2000 Olympic Games in Sydney, narrowly missing the final round. He is currently the national team coach for the Athletic Federation of Bosnia and Herzegovina.

His personal best in the event is 2.31 metres outdoors, achieved in 1998, and 2.29 metres indoors from 1999. Both results are standing Bosnia and Herzegovina records. Krehmić was coached by Munir Selimović.

Competition record

Note: This table only includes major athletics championships and does not include Diamond League or IAAF World Challenge meets.

References
 
 
 

1973 births
Living people
Sportspeople from Zenica
Male high jumpers
Bosnia and Herzegovina high jumpers
Bosnia and Herzegovina male athletes
Olympic athletes of Bosnia and Herzegovina
Athletes (track and field) at the 2000 Summer Olympics
World Athletics Championships athletes for Bosnia and Herzegovina
Mediterranean Games bronze medalists for Bosnia and Herzegovina
Mediterranean Games medalists in athletics
Athletes (track and field) at the 1997 Mediterranean Games
Athletes (track and field) at the 2001 Mediterranean Games